Kuusalu is a small borough in Harju County, northern Estonia. It is the administrative centre of Kuusalu Parish and has a population of 1,220 as of 1 January 2010.

Notable people
Eduard Ahrens (1803–1863), clergyman and linguist
Ludvig Oskar (1874–1951), painter
Veljo Tormis (1930–2017), composer

See also
Kuusalu JK Rada

References

External links
Kuusalu Parish

Boroughs and small boroughs in Estonia
Kreis Harrien